Eny Widiowati (born 12 July 1980) is an Indonesian retired badminton player.

Career 
Widiowati was part of the Indonesia junior team that competed at the 1997 and 1998 Asian Junior Championships, winning a silver and bronze in the girls' team event respectively, also finished as the semifinalists in the girls' doubles event, clinched the bronze medals. She then claimed the girls' doubles bronze at the 1998 World Junior Championships in Melbourne.

Widiowati competed in badminton at the 2004 Summer Olympics in the mixed doubles with partner Anggun Nugroho. They defeated Nikolai Zuyev and Marina Yakusheva of Russia in the first round but lost to Chen Qiqiu and Zhao Tingting of China in the round of 16. She won the mixed doubles at the 2005 French Open with the Algerian-French player Nabil Lasmari.

Personal life 
Widiowati married two-time world champions and mixed doubles legend Nova Widianto.

Achievements

Asian Championships 
Mixed doubles

Southeast Asian Games 
Mixed doubles

World Junior Championships 
Girls' doubles

Asian Junior Championships 
Girls' doubles

IBF World Grand Prix 
The World Badminton Grand Prix was sanctioned by the International Badminton Federation from 1983 to 2006.

Mixed doubles

IBF International 
Women's doubles

Mixed doubles

References

External links 
 
 
 
 

1980 births
Living people
Indonesian female badminton players
Badminton players at the 2004 Summer Olympics
Olympic badminton players of Indonesia
Competitors at the 2003 Southeast Asian Games
Southeast Asian Games silver medalists for Indonesia
Southeast Asian Games bronze medalists for Indonesia
Southeast Asian Games medalists in badminton
20th-century Indonesian women
21st-century Indonesian women